James Albert Groves (July 1883 – after 1909), known as Albert Groves, was an English footballer who made 118 appearances in the Football League playing for Lincoln City, Sheffield United and Middlesbrough. He played as a full back. He began his career with his local club, South Bank of the Northern League, and later played for North Eastern League club Wingate Albion. In February 1905, he played for The North in a trial for England's international match against Ireland later that month, but was not selected.

References 

1883 births
Year of death missing
People from South Bank, Redcar and Cleveland
English footballers
Association football fullbacks
South Bank F.C. players
Lincoln City F.C. players
Sheffield United F.C. players
Middlesbrough F.C. players
English Football League players
Place of death missing
Footballers from Yorkshire